Juliette, or Key of Dreams is a 1951 French drama film directed by Marcel Carné. It was entered into the 1951 Cannes Film Festival.  The film is based on a play by Georges Neveux.

Cast
 Gérard Philipe as Michel Grandier
 Suzanne Cloutier as Juliette
 Jean-Roger Caussimon as Le châtelain & Monsieur Bellanger (as J.R. Caussimon)
 René Génin as Le père Lajeunesse & le greffier
 Roland Lesaffre as Le légionnaire
 Gabrielle Fontan as La patronne de la confiserie
 Pierre Vernier as a young man selling keepsakes
 Arthur Devère as Le marchand de souvenirs (as Arthur Devere)
 Louise Fouquet as La compagne du légionnaire
 Martial Rèbe as L'employé (as Martial Rebbe)
 Marion Delbo as L'accorte ménagère
 Fernand René as Le facteur
 Marcelle Arnold as La femme acariâtre

References

External links

1951 films
French drama films
1950s French-language films
1951 drama films
French black-and-white films
Films directed by Marcel Carné
French films based on plays
1950s French films